Sheikh Faydh Mosque was an ancient Sunni mosque in Mashhad, Iran, one of the main Shi'ite religious places. It was  demolished it in 1993, under the alleged supervision of the Islamic Revolutionary Guard Corps, who also demolished adjoining centers which were used as guest houses and Koran memorization centers. Many critics claim that the demolition orders came from Ayatollah Khamenei personally but since he as has been at the forefront of promoting unity between shias and sunnis., the present spiritual leader of Iran. The demolition of this mosque occurred immediately after the government sponsored demonstrations against the demolition of the Babri Mosque in India by the Hindus.

On 4 February 2001 the imam of the mosque, Mevlavi Musa Karami, was assassinated by an explosion outside a mosque in Herat, some believe by the Iranian government.

See also

 Status of religious freedom in Iran

External links
 List of Sunni victims of the Iranian regime (in Persian)

Buildings and structures demolished in 1993
Mosques in Iran
Buildings and structures in Mashhad
Demolished buildings and structures in Iran